Saint Matthew Passion can refer to:

 St Matthew Passion, a musical composition written by Johann Sebastian Bach
 Saint Matthew Passion (film), a 1966 documentary film